The 1877 Oldham by-election was fought on 1 March 1877.  The byelection was fought due to the death of the incumbent Conservative MP, John Morgan Cobbett.  It was won by the Liberal candidate J. T. Hibbert.

References

Oldham by-election
Oldham by-election
1870s in Lancashire
Elections in the Metropolitan Borough of Oldham
Oldham 1877
Oldham 1877